The Baoji–Chengdu railway or Baocheng railway, is a mixed single- and double-track, electrified, railroad in China between Baoji in Shaanxi province and Chengdu in Sichuan province. The Baocheng Line is the main railway connection between the northern/northwestern and southwestern China.  The line has a total length of 668.2 km and passes through mostly mountainous terrain in southern Shaanxi, eastern Gansu and northern Sichuan.  It opened in 1961 as the first rail outlet from Sichuan, and in 1975 became the first railway in China to be electrified.  Other cities along route include Mianyang, Guangyuan, Guanghan and Lueyang.

Line description

The Baocheng Line runs from the plains of the Sichuan Basin to the Wei River Valley.  It traverses the Qin Mountains, the east–west range that divides northern from southern China.  The line has 304 tunnels and 1,001 bridges, which collectively account for 17% of the total track length.

In Baoji, the line meets the Longhai railway, on which trains can travel east to Xian and the Central Plains or west to Lanzhou and the northwest.  At Yangpingguan, the line intersects with the Yangpingguan–Ankang railway which branches eastward along the Han River Valley.  In Chengdu, the line connects with the Chengyu Line to Chongqing, Chengqian Line to Guizhou, and Chengkun Line to Kunming.

History

The Baocheng line was originally proposed in Sun Yat-sen's 1913 China National railway plan as part of the Datong–Chengdu railway.  Construction began in Chengdu on July 1, 1952 and from Baoji in January 1954.  The line opened on January 1, 1958.  The Baoji–Fengzhou section electrified in 1961, becoming the first railway to be electrified in the country.  The entire line was electrified in 1971.  Construction of a second track between Chengdu and Yangpingguan began in 1993 and was completed in 1999.  From Yangpingguan to Baoji, the line remains single-track.  The railway was badly damaged by the 2008 Sichuan earthquake.

The Baoji–Chengdu railway, together with the Xi'an–Baoji section of the Longhai railway, formed the main railway route between Xi'an and Chengdu (and, in general, between North China and Sichuan). However, the new Xi'an–Chengdu high-speed railway, between these two cities has assumed much of the passenger traffic on this route.

Rail junctions
Sichuan Province
 Chengdu: Chengdu–Kunming railway, Dazhou–Chengdu railway, Chengdu–Chongqing railway
 Yangpingguan: Yangpingguan–Ankang railway
Shaanxi Province
 Baoji: Longhai railway

See also

 List of railways in China

References

Railway lines in China
Rail transport in Sichuan
Rail transport in Gansu
Rail transport in Shaanxi